Horsepower Productions are an English electronic music duo, initially a larger musical collective who released experimental garage recordings, and helped pioneer the dubstep genre.

Lineup
The group was initially composed of Benny Ill (born Ben Garner), Jay King, Lev Jnr, Nasis and four other members.
The eight were closely associated with the influential drum & bass record label No U Turn, and its UK garage-oriented sister label Turn U On.

Garner has since collaborated on the seminal "Fat Larry's Skank" track, which has been remixed and re-versioned many times by producers including Kode9, as well as collaborating with Hatcha on a number of tracks, DJing at FWD>>, and releasing more straightforward dub as part of the duo Bill & Ben.

After a five-year hiatus, Garner returned to Horsepower with new collaborator Jay King, with a 12" single, "Kingstep/Damn It" in 2009 and an LP in November 2010 entitled Quest for the Sonic Bounty, both on Tempa.

Sound
Early Horsepower releases were resolutely UK garage in sound, but the mainly instrumental, dub versions which were often B-sides of these releases proved to be extremely influential; stripped-down, minimal re-versions, with the emphasis on shuffled, intricate, crisp percussion and subbass.

Meanwhile, Horsepower Productions' 12 inches and other similarly minded music experimenting with the garage archetype were staples in Croydon's Big Apple Records, a record shop staffed and frequented by many artists later to become extremely influential in the dubstep and grime genres. In 2002, as interest in the dubstep genre grew, Horsepower Productions released In Fine Style, a collection of earlier 12" releases on compact disc accompanied by six new tracks in a double twelve-inch pack. The LP has been described as the "origin" or "birth" of dubstep.

The duo's influence was acknowledged by the inclusion of several Horsepower Productions tracks on Tempa's 2006 Roots of Dubstep compilation.

Discography

Studio albums
In Fine Style (2002)
To the Rescue (2004)
Quest for the Sonic Bounty (2010)
The Lost Tapes EP (2011)
"Crooks, Crime & Corruption" (2016)

Singles
"When You Hold Me"/"Let's Dance" (2000) [TEMPA001]
"Gorgon Sound"/"Triple 7" (2000) [TEMPA002]
"One You Need" (2001) [TNU 001]
"Vigilante"/"What We Do" (Remix) (2001) [TEMPA003]
"Electro Bass" (2002) [TNU 002]
"Fist of Fury"/"To the Beat Y'all" (2002) [TEMPA005]
"Smokin'" (PC Edit)/"The Swindle" (2002) [TEMPA006]
"Kingstep"/"Damn It" (2009) [TEMPA042]
"Justify"/"Good Ole Dayz" (2011) [TEMPA059]

References

English electronic music duos
Electronic dance music duos
UK garage duos
Dubstep music groups
Musical groups established in 2000